The common Eupselia moth, Eupselia carpocapsella, is a species of moth of the family Depressariidae. It is found in Australia, where it has been recorded from New South Wales and South Australia.

The larvae feed on the foliage of Eucalyptus species.

References

External links
Taxonomy

Moths described in 1864
Eupselia
Moths of Australia